Phillip E. Hardy (born May 27, 1956) is an American screenwriter, music critic and musician.

He was born in Manhassett, New York.

Career
Hardy began his drumming career in the mid 1970s, occasionally filling in as substitute drummer for Los Angeles punk band The Weasels, as well as jamming and recording with musicians including Dean Chamberlain, The Skulls and opening up for many notable LA rock bands.

During the 1980s he twice worked with Asylum Kids bassist and vocalist Dino Archon in bands named DV8 and Symbol Positive playing at Club Lingerie, Madame Wong's, and The Troubadour and on the Radio stage at the 1984 LA Street Scene. During the early 1990s, he fronted his own band Badge of Honor playing numerous live shows and had original songs featured on KLOS Radio Best of Local Licks show.

In a May 9, 1994 Music Connection magazine review, Hardy’s vocal style was compared to Harry Chapin and in a July 4, 1994 article said his drumming was described as “As precise as the tick-tock of Big Ben and rocks like a run away renegade.

Hardy was awarded a Bachelor of Science in Business Management in 2001 and a Master of Management from the University of Redlands in 2003. In 2009, he completed the Project Manager Certificate Program at Stanford University. In January 2004, his album Old Dog, New Tricks was released and received positive reviews from publications including Fufkin magazine, Ripping Tracks and IOM magazine. Hardy released his second album Upon Politics, Love and Reflection in late September 2009.

Hardy has played drums with several blues and rock artists including Joe Houston, Marcella Detroit, Brian Ray, Jerry Cole and Guitar Shorty; and appeared as opening act for Canned Heat, The Motels, Rank and File and Animotion. Hardy has recently been performing with The Lively Ones of Pulp Fiction fame, in addition to New Blues Revolution who performed at the 2010 Los Angeles Music Awards.

Writings 
Hardy is a contributor to The Marshalltonwn Chronile and Hackwriters online magazine.

He is the author of one self-published novel, Vengeance Is Mine, the Story of the Hatfields and McCoys, reissued in 2006 and revised in 2011 as Kingdom of the Hollow, the Story of the Hatfields and McCoys. In a December 2006 review, Roundup magazine described the book as "an action-filled, fictionalized account of the feud, with a strong sense of place, rich descriptive narrative full of regional detail, and crisply drawn characters.".

Most recently, he has written several screenplays, including  Four Negro Girls in a Church, a historical drama about the 16th Street Baptist Church Bombing, The Man Who Bore The Myth, a J.D. Salinger biopic, Finalist at Hill Country Film Festival, Within These Walls, The Angela Davis Story, which was an Official Selection of the Richmond International Film Festival and Once Upon A Time In LA that won a Gold Medal for best thriller at the Beverly Hills Screenplay Competition. In 2014, he was also a three time quarter-finalist at Screencraft Action/Thriller Competition, a finalist with honorable mention at Creative Scope Awards for The Willing, current quarter-finalist at Filmmakers International Screenplay Awards for Within These Walls, the Angela Davis Story, semi-finalist at the Screenplay Festival for Pascal's Coming and Special Selection at Artemis Women in Action Film Festival for Gina Jericho.

Bibliography
Kingdom Of The Hollow, the Story of the Hatfields and McCoys (2011) 
Confessions of a Bipolar Poet*  (2008)
''Singing, For My Supper, The Greatest Self Help Book Ever Written* (2012)

References

Citations
anonymous, (1994, May 9). Phillip Hardy Demo Critique. Music Connection, 34*
Triolo, Steve, (1994, July 4). Bill Grisolia and the Attachments at the Roxy Hollywood. Music Connection, 38*

External links
Music by Phillip E. Hardy
Extract from Kingdom of the Hollow, the Story of the Hatfields and McCoys
Occupy Wall Street, The Dunces Declaration of Independence
Singing For My Supper - The Greatest Self Help Book Ever Written 
Kingdom Of The Hollow, The Story Of The Hatfields And McCoys
Within These Walls, The Angela Davis Story
The Immortal Jack the Ripper
Spotlight: 5 Questions With Screenwriter Phillip E. Hardy

1956 births
American music critics
People from Long Island
Living people
20th-century American drummers
American male drummers
20th-century American male musicians